Louisa Bernie Gallaher, also known as L. Bernie Gallaher, was an American scientific photographer for the Smithsonian United States National Museum (USNM). She was the Smithsonian's first woman photographer and worked at the institution for 39 years, from 1878 until her death in 1917.

Life and career
Gallaher was born in Washington, D.C. in 1858, to mother Eliza A. Gallaher and father B. Frank Gallaher. At the age of 20, Gallaher began her work at the Smithsonian as a clerk, and later began teaching herself photography during her time in the museum's mammalian department. By 1890, she was transferred to the institution's photographic department, where she became the chief assistant to Smithsonian's first photographer, Thomas Smillie, who took notice to her developing photography skills prior to the transfer. She was tasked with the photography of people and museum displays, such as paintings, engravings, and sculptures. Additionally, she specialized in photomicrography, and created X-ray reproductions. Occasionally, Gallahar could be seen working outside, where she shot photographs of animals.

As part of her work at the museum, she developed various photos, creating platinum prints and processing others' photographs that were sent to the museum. Furthermore, she created lantern slides, which were used in lectures across the United States and Europe.

Gallaher continued to work in the museum's photographic department until her death on April 18, 1917 in Washington, D.C., at the age of 59. Prior to her death, much of her work was falsely credited to her boss, Thomas Smillie. By 2019, Smithsonian archivists had begun correcting Gallaher's missing credits.

References

1858 births
1917 deaths
Photographers from Washington, D.C.
19th-century American women photographers
20th-century American women photographers
Smithsonian Institution people
19th-century American photographers
20th-century American photographers